Nanna Bryndís Hilmarsdóttir (born 6 May 1989) is an Icelandic musician. Nanna originally performed solo, performing by the name Songbird. She is the lead vocalist and guitarist, along with Ragnar "Raggi" Þórhallsson, of the Icelandic indie folk band Of Monsters and Men.

Biography
Nanna was raised in Garður, a town in southwestern Iceland. She has two sisters, one is a make up artist and the other a teacher. As a child, Nanna attended music school. Before Of Monsters and Men had become established, Nanna had a solo musical project called Songbird. She wrote and performed music on open mic nights around Reykjavik and was a video store clerk.

Of Monsters and Men 
Since expanding her Songbird phase, Nanna recruited five musicians, that eventually became Of Monsters and Men in 2010 – Brynjar Leifsson, Ragnar Þórhallsson, Arnar Rósenkranz Hilmarsson, Árni Guðjónsson (now, ex-member), and Kristján Páll Kristjánsson. After a week of working together, they won the annual music competition Músíktilraunir.

They soon released their debut studio album My Head Is an Animal in late 2011. The album charted in multiple regions and the band gained popularity worldwide. After the Seattle radio station KEXP broadcast a performance from Ragnar's living room, the band went viral. The album reached No.1 in Australia, Iceland and Ireland and No.1 on the U.S. Rock and Alternative charts. The band was tapped to write a song for the film The Hunger Games: Catching Fire  and then a single Dirty Paws that was used in The Secret Life of Walter Mitty 18 months after its release. The song "I of the Storm" was included in the USA television series "Falling Water".

They released three singles called "Little Talks", "Mountain Sound", and "King and Lionheart" and music videos for each. The videos received several million views on YouTube, the one for "Little Talks" having the most views (316 Million views as of September 2021).

The band went on to release the album Beneath the Skin in 2015, along with three music videos and thirteen lyric videos. Their latest album, Fever Dream, was released in May 2019. They performed the songs “Alligator”, “Wild Roses”, and “Wars" on Jimmy Kimmel and Ellen and released music videos for each.

Solo Career 
On 13 January 2023, she released the single "Godzilla" under the name Nanna, followed by a second single "Crybaby" on 22 February, and the announcement of a solo album entitled "How To Start A Garden" to be released on 5 May of the same year.

Artistry 
Nanna cites some of her favorite musicians/influences as Gayngs, Lianne La Havas, Arcade Fire, Feist, and Justin Vernon, of the alt-folk band Bon Iver.

References

Living people
Nanna Bryndis Hilmarsdottir
Nanna Bryndis Hilmarsdottir
Alternative rock singers
Nanna Bryndis Hilmarsdottir
Indie rock musicians
Folk rock musicians
Nanna Bryndis Hilmarsdottir
21st-century Icelandic singers
Lead guitarists
Icelandic women singer-songwriters
1989 births
21st-century guitarists
21st-century Icelandic women singers
Of Monsters and Men members
21st-century women guitarists